Chicala is a city and commune of Angola, located in the province of Bié. It has an electrical substation, with gas isolation technology, which is fundamental to guarantee the reliability of power supply to the city of Luanda.

References 

Populated places in Bié Province
Municipalities of Angola